Sekhar Suri is an Indian film director predominantly works for Telugu films. He got good recognition for the thriller film A Film by Aravind. He directed 4 Telugu films and a Hindi film so far. All his movies has the some thriller elements in them.

Personal life 
Sekhar was born in Tanuku, West Godavari district of Andhra Pradesh. He used to watch a lot of TV series as a kid. God father was his favorite series on Doordarshan. This obsession continued till his graduation. He spent most of his early life in Hyderabad. He discontinued his degree in commerce to become a film maker.

His original name is SS Chandra Sekhar. Since Chandra Sekhar is a very common name in the film industry, he changed his name to Sekhar Suri. Another Tollywood director Indraganti Mohanakrishna is his cousin.

Career 
He happened to meet actor Tarun on an occasion with the help of his friend. With the help of Tarun, he got a chance to meet the owner of Super Good Films. This way he got a chance to direct Tarun for the film Adrustam. The script of the film was loosely based on Roman Holiday. However, the film did not do well at the box office.

Later he prepared the script on his own and made it into a film A Film by Aravind starring Rajeev Kanakala, Richard Rishi, and Mona Chopra in the lead roles. This film became a hit. Rishi had bagged seven films after this film. Next he made a psychological thriller film Three which was a real life incident happened in Hyderabad. This film received critical response. Next he made a film Aravind 2 starring Srinivas Avasarala, Kamal Kamaraju and others.

He is currently working on a bollywood film Guns of Banaras with hero Karan Nath

Filmography 
 Adrustam (2002)
 A Film by Aravind (2005)
 Three (2008)
 Aravind 2 (2013)
 Dr Charkravarthy (2017)
 Guns of Banaras (2020)

References

External links 
 

Living people
21st-century Indian film directors
Telugu film directors
Film directors from Andhra Pradesh
People from West Godavari district
Year of birth missing (living people)